"The Nosebleed Section" is a song by the Australian hip hop music group Hilltop Hoods. It was released as a radio single in 2003, and was the final single release from their 2003 album The Calling. The chorus and backing beat of "The Nosebleed Section" are sampled from the song "The People in the Front Row" sung by Melanie Safka. 

The lyrics of the song deal with upbeat themes of parties, concerts, good times and living the high life involved in an MC's career. Matt Lambert (MC Suffa) said, "That was definitely a turning point for us. When Triple J started playing it, that was our break. We started getting a lot of festival gigs, show offers, stuff like that."

The song placed at number 9 on the Triple J Hottest 100, 2003. 

In 2009, it was voted Number 17 in the Hottest 100 of All Time, and in 2013 it was voted Number 4 in the Hottest 100 of the Past 20 Years, making it the highest-placed Australian song and the highest-placed hip-hop song in both countdowns as well as the highest-placed song from the 21st century in the former despite never being released as a physical single. 

The song appeared on the Channel 9 police drama Stingers.

Charts

Certifications

References

2003 songs
Hilltop Hoods songs
Songs written by Suffa
Songs written by MC Pressure
Obese Records singles